Demodex ponderosus is a hair follicle mite found on thinly haired regions (tail and paws) of the brown rat, Rattus norvegicus.

References

Trombidiformes
Animals described in 2014